Cryonics Institute (CI) is an American nonprofit foundation that provides cryonics services. CI freezes deceased humans and pets in liquid nitrogen with the hope of restoring them with technology in the future.

History 
The Cryonics Institute was founded by the “Father of Cryonics” Robert Ettinger on April 4, 1976, in Detroit, Michigan, where he served as president until 2003. Ettinger introduced the concept of cryonics with the publication of his book “The Prospect of Immortality” published in 1962. Operations moved to Clinton Township, Michigan in 1993, where it is currently located.

Membership 

The Cryonics Institute has 232 people cryopreserved in tanks of liquid nitrogen.  Robert Ettinger the 106th is cryopreserved along with his mother and two wives, Elaine and Mae.

Operations and procedures 
The cryonics procedure performed by the Cryonics Institute begins with a process called vitrification where the body is perfused with cryoprotective agents to protect against damage in the freezing process. After this, the body is cooled to -196 °C over the course of a day or two days in a computer-controlled chamber before being placed in a long-term storage container filled with liquid nitrogen. The Cryonics Institute utilizes storage units called cryostats, and each unit contains up to eight people. The process can take place only once the person has been declared legally dead. Ideally, the process begins within two minutes of the heart stopping and no more than 15.

The Cryonics Institute also specializes in Human Cryostasis, DNA/Tissue Freezing, Pet Cryopreservation, and Memorabilia Storage.

See also 
Alcor Life Extension Foundation
Information-theoretic death

References 

1976 establishments in Michigan
Cryonics organizations in the United States